Virginia Anne Phillips (born February 14, 1957) is a Senior United States district judge of the United States District Court for the Central District of California.

Early life and education
Born (as Virginia Ettinger) and raised in Orange, California, Phillips received a Bachelor of Arts degree from the University of California, Riverside, in 1979 and a Juris Doctor from the University of California, Berkeley, Boalt Hall School of Law in 1982. She was in private practice in Riverside, California, from 1982 to 1991. She was a Commissioner for the Riverside County Superior Court from 1991 to 1995.

Judicial service
In 1995, Phillips became a United States magistrate judge of the Central District of California. On January 26, 1999, Phillips was nominated by President Bill Clinton to be a United States District Judge of the United States District Court for the Central District of California, to a seat vacated by William Matthew Byrne Jr. She was confirmed by the United States Senate on November 10, 1999, and received her commission on November 15, 1999. Phillips served as Chief Judge from July 1, 2016 to May 31, 2020. Phillips assumed senior status on February 14, 2022, her 65th birthday.

Notable cases
On September 9, 2010, Phillips ruled that the United States Department of Defense's "don't ask, don't tell" policy is unconstitutional in the case Log Cabin Republicans v. United States of America. On October 12, Phillips issued a permanent worldwide injunction ordering the military to immediately "suspend and discontinue any investigation, or discharge, separation, or other proceeding, that may have been commenced" under "don't ask, don't tell". The Ninth Circuit stayed the injunction pending appeal but on July 6, 2011, lifted the stay. On September 29, 2011, the Ninth Circuit vacated the district court's decision, ruling that the legislative repeal of "don't ask, don't tell" had rendered the case moot.

References

Sources

External links

Woman In the News | Virginia A. Phillips, A Judge Lauded as No-Nonsense and Scholarly (New York Times, September 10, 2010)
Judicial Milestones: Virginia Anne Phillips

1957 births
Living people
Judges of the United States District Court for the Central District of California
People from Orange, California
United States district court judges appointed by Bill Clinton
United States magistrate judges
University of California, Riverside alumni
UC Berkeley School of Law alumni
20th-century American judges
21st-century American judges
20th-century American women judges
21st-century American women judges